Join the Triumph is the second studio album by Citizens & Saints, after their previous album Citizens was released when they were originally named Citizens. The album came out on November 11, 2014 on BEC Recordings.

Reception

From CCM Magazine, Andy Argyrakis opines "though the group's overtly worshipful and oftentimes redemptive lyrics are as much a focal point as members' commendable creativity." From Cross Rhythms, Matt McChlery references "The recording is predominantly a collection of soaring anthems although there are moments of stillness and quiet that creates an effective ebb and flow to the album... Drawing on a variety of genres and musical styles and using a myriad of amazing synth and keyboard effects, Citizens & Saints have created a top quality project." From Jesus Freak Hideout, Ryan Barbee suggests "Join the Triumph is a great collection of songs to be used within the context of corporate church gatherings, but not much more than that." From New Release Tuesday, Caitlin Lassiter expresses "Join The Triumph seems to be a perfect name for this collection of songs, containing themes of grace, redemption and the greatness of our God running through every track." From Christian Review Magazine, Leah St. John recognizes, "it's a bit of a mixed bag."

Track listing

Charts

References 

2014 albums
Citizens & Saints albums
BEC Recordings albums